Joppa is a census-designated place (CDP) and unincorporated community in Cullman and Marshall counties, Alabama, United States. As of the 2020 census, its population was 556.

History
Joppa was named after the ancient city of Jaffa.

In the early 20th century, Joppa was an incorporated community within Cullman County and was listed on the U.S. Census from 1900 to 1920. It did not reappear on the census until 2010 when it was made a census-designated place (CDP).

On April 27, 2011, a tornado reportedly hit ground in the Joppa area as part of the 2011 Super Outbreak.

Geography
A small portion of the CDP extends north into Marshall County.

Joppa is located along Alabama State Route 69.

Demographics

Notable people
Jack Lively, former Major League Baseball pitcher for the Detroit Tigers

References

Census-designated places in Cullman County, Alabama
Census-designated places in Alabama